Orthosia is a genus of moths of the family Noctuidae erected by Ferdinand Ochsenheimer in 1816.

Species

Former species
 Orthosia johnstoni McDunnough, 1943 is now a synonym of Perigonica pectinata (Smith, [1888])

References
Hreblay, M. & Plante, J. (1994). Acta Zoologica Academiae Scientiarim Hungaricae 40(1): 21–27.

 
Orthosiini
Taxa named by Ferdinand Ochsenheimer